Andrea Fendt (born 31 January 1960, in Bischofswiesen) is a West German luger who competed during the 1970s. She won the silver medal in the women's singles event at the 1978 FIL World Luge Championships in Imst, Austria.

Fendt's brother, Josef, has been president of the International Luge Federation since 1994.

Fendt finished second overall in the women's singles Luge World Cup in 1977–8. She finished 12th in the women's singles event at the 1980 Winter Olympics in Lake Placid.

References
1980 luge women's singles results
Hickok sports information on World champions in luge and skeleton.
List of women's singles luge World Cup champions since 1978.
SportQuick.com information on World champions in luge 

German female lugers
Living people
Lugers at the 1980 Winter Olympics
1960 births
Olympic lugers of West Germany
People from Berchtesgadener Land
Sportspeople from Upper Bavaria